Conversations with a Killer may refer to:

 Conversations with a Killer: The John Wayne Gacy Tapes a 2022 Netflix docu-series about serial killer John Wayne Gacy
 Conversations with a Killer: The Ted Bundy Tapes, a 2019 Netflix docu-series about Ted Bundy
 The Iceman Confesses: Conversations with a Killer, a 1992 HBO documentary about Richard Kuklinski
 Ted Bundy: Conversations with a Killer, a 2000 true crime book by Hugh Aynesworth and Stephen G. Michaud